Written in Bone is a novel written by the British crime fiction writer Simon Beckett, first published in 2007. It is the second novel to feature Dr. David Hunter.

Set in the Outer Hebrides, this crime novel features forensic anthropologist Dr. David Hunter.  In this volume, he is called in to examine a badly burned body found in a deserted house on a small island while contending with both personal and professional obstacles.  It received positive reviews as being better than Beckett's first novel, with satisfying plot twists and well-implemented scientific details.

References

2007 British novels
Dr David Hunter (series)
Novels set in the Outer Hebrides
Bantam Press books
Delacorte Press books